The 1986 Austrian motorcycle Grand Prix was the fourth round of the 1986 Grand Prix motorcycle racing season. It took place on the weekend of 6–8 June 1986 at the Salzburgring.

Classification

500 cc

References

Austrian motorcycle Grand Prix
Austrian
Motorcycle Grand Prix
Austrian motorcycle Grand Prix